Dick Damron (born Joseph Glenn Damron, March 22, 1934 in Bentley, Alberta) is a Canadian country music singer, songwriter. Damron experimented with many musical styles in the country genre including: ‘Outlaw’, Rockabilly, Honkey Tonk, and Gospel.  Over a recording career spanning 60 years he has recorded more than 25 albums, received numerous country music awards, and been inducted into the International Country Music Hall Of Fame, in Beaumont, Texas.

Early career
Damron started his career performing in both rock and country bands, including the Musical Round-Up Gang (on CKRD radio, Red Deer) and the Nightriders.  His recording career began in 1957 with his original '45 Havin' A Party/ Rockin' Baby. Then, in '60 he recorded two LP's for his own label, Holiday. In '61, he issued his first Nashville studio album on Quality Records, then had a Canadian #1 hit with "Hitchhiking" in '63. He continued recording and touring throughout the 60's, building up a growing fan base.

Damron had a breakthrough hit in 1970 with ‘Countryfied’ for Apex records.  He found further success throughout the 1970s with singles such as: ‘Rise ‘n’ Shine,’ ‘The Long Green Line,’ ‘Mother, Love and Country’, and ‘Susan Flowers’.

In 1978 Damron signed his first major label contract and began recording for RCA.  By this point he had become an established performer in the ‘outlaw’ style and a well known songwriter.  His most popular singles for RCA included ‘Silver and Shine,’ ‘Whisky Jack,’ ‘Honky Tonk Angels and Good Ol’ Boys’, and ‘Good Ol’ Time Country Rock ‘n’ Roll’.

Throughout the years Damron has performed at many notable shows and venues, including the Grand Ole Opry in Nashville (1972).  He also toured Europe many times throughout the 70's and 80's, the highlight being a performance at the Wembley International Country Music Festival in London, England.  He spent 6 seasons as the resident band at Howard Hughes' Desert Inn in Las Vegas from '85 to '91. Canadian performances include appearances on Canadian television networks CBC and CTV, a concert at the Calgary Stampede, as well as numerous other performances in clubs, concerts, festivals, and fairs. The last few decades, DD has been spent his winters in Mazatlan, Mexico where he continues to perform shows for sold-out crowds.

Musical Contacts
As a solo artist,  Damron has been known to play with a wide circle of top notch musicians, including Jerry Reed and Buddy Emmons in Nashville sessions, and James Burton sitting in at a Las Vegas jam. He has rubbed elbows and shared stages with Marty Robbins, Waylon Jennings, Ronnie Hawkins and many others. The Stoney Creek Band, featuring Brian Richard, Sam Taylor and Myron Szott, was his main backup group over the years. His gregarious nature has earned him many friends along the way. His songs have been covered by numerous artists, including Charlie Pride, George Hamilton IV, Wilf Carter, Carroll Baker, Gary Buck, Terry Carisse, Jimmy Arthur Ordge, Orval Prophet, and Rhythm Pals.

Awards
Damron has won too many awards to list completely, but here is a sample: 
The Big Country award as top country music composer in 1976 and '84, best male country singer award in the years 1976–1978, and '83.  ‘Susan Flowers’ was declared the Big Country best country single in 1997.  He has won CCMA awards as best male vocalist (1983), instrumentalist (1985), entertainer (1989), and for best single in 1984 (‘Jesus, it’s me again’).  Texas Proud Award '80-'83. He was also inducted into the International Country Music Hall of Fame, in Beaumont Texas on October 14, 2001. Seven time BMI Songwriter Award winner.

Author
DD has also written three published books, two fictional thrillers (Rockabye Baby Blues and Pacific Coast Radio) and an autobiography (The Legend and the Legacy).

Discography
Note: Bear Family Records, a company dedicated to preserving music of historical value, has acquired the rights to much of Damron's portfolio and released a multi-CD collection of his works, from the early days to his most recent output.

Albums

Singles

Singles with Ginny Mitchell

References

External links
 Dick Damron's homepage.
 Dick Damron's entry in the Canadian encyclopedia
 Damron rated at Rateyourmusic.com
 Damron at Rocky-52.net
 Damron at Spiritriver.com
 Damron at Seniorchoice.com
 Damron article at Countrymusicnews.ca
 

1934 births
Canadian country singer-songwriters
Canadian male singers
RCA Victor artists
Living people
Musicians from Alberta
Canadian Country Music Association Entertainer(s) of the Year winners
Canadian Country Music Association Fans' Choice Award winners
Canadian Country Music Association Male Artist of the Year winners
Canadian male singer-songwriters